Bruce Macpherson (born May 19, 1958 in Pembury, United Kingdom) is a former field hockey player from Canada.

Macpherson participated in the 1984 Summer Olympics in Los Angeles, California. There he finished in tenth place with the Men's National Team.

International senior competitions

 1984 – Olympic Games, Los Angeles (10th)

References
 Canadian Olympic Committee

External links
 

1958 births
Living people
Canadian male field hockey players
Canadian people of Scottish descent
English emigrants to Canada
Field hockey players at the 1984 Summer Olympics
Olympic field hockey players of Canada